The Concha d'Ostra Sustainable Development Reserve is a sustainable development reserve in the state of Espírito Santo, Brazil.

Location

The Concha d'Ostra Sustainable Development Reserve is in the municipality of Guarapari, Espírito Santo.
The area is mainly covered by mangroves but also includes some coastal forest.
Economically important fauna are crustaceans and molluscs, and fish such as sea bass and mullet.
The proximity to the city of Guarapari makes it a challenge to manage the reserve and maintain its integrity.
During the closed season the capture, transport and marketing of crabs is prohibited, and surveillance by SEMA is increased.

History

The Concha d'Ostra Sustainable Development Reserve was originally created as an ecological station in 2003.
It became part of the Central Atlantic Forest Ecological Corridor, created in 2002.
It was recategorized as a sustainable development reserve by state law 8464 of March 2007.
The purpose is to protect the estuarine mangroves of the Bay of Guarapari, an important breeding area for several species of fish and crustaceans, while allowing the sustainable use of these natural resources by the traditional residents.

The management council was formed in October 2010.
In December 2012 IEMA and the municipality of Guarapari agreed on a R$2 million project to build physical barriers, wooden walkways and gardens in an effort to stem the constant invasions and illegal housing construction that was threatening the reserve.

Notes

Sources

Sustainable development reserves of Brazil
Protected areas of Espírito Santo
Protected areas of the Atlantic Forest
Environment of Espírito Santo